The Morphodite is a novel by M. A. Foster published in 1981.

Plot summary
The Morphodite is a novel in which a man with no memory is trained as an assassin and given the ability to shape-change.

Reception
Greg Costikyan reviewed The Morphodite in Ares Magazine #13 and commented that "The Morphodite is different from what we think of as traditional science fiction because it is a psychological novel, which is something we associate with mainstream fiction; yet it is a novel which attempts to explore unusual ideas, which is the essence of science fiction."

Reviews
Review by Baird Searles (1982) in Isaac Asimov's Science Fiction Magazine, April 1982 
Review by Tom Easton (1982) in Analog Science Fiction/Science Fact, July 1982

References

1981 novels